Allison Langdon (born 20 May 1979) is an Australian television presenter, reporter, journalist, and author.

She is currently the host of A Current Affair and was a co-host of Today and Weekend Today. Langdon also is a reporter and presenter on the localised version of current affairs program 60 Minutes.

Early life and training
Langdon attended Wauchope High School and Port Macquarie's MacKillop Senior College. During her time at school, she presented radio programs on Monday evenings on the local community radio station 2WAY FM, which is based in Wauchope. After leaving school, she studied journalism at Charles Sturt University and filed stories for the National Radio News service of the Australian Community Radio Network, run by the CBAA.

Career

Langdon joined the Nine Network after completing her journalism degree, which included an internship with CBS in New York City. She began her media career as a producer for Nightline in 2001.

In 2002, Langdon worked as a producer for the 6:00pm bulletin of National Nine News. Seeking more on-the-road experience, Langdon moved to Nine's Darwin newsroom and, in her first year in the Top End, won the David Marchbank Award for best new journalist.  Alongside her round as political reporter for the Northern Territory, Langdon travelled to Mexico and East Timor covering stories for news and the Sunday program.

Langdon was one of the first Australian journalists on the ground following the Australian Embassy Bombing in Jakarta in September 2004. She filed daily for all of Nine's bulletins.

In October 2004, Langdon returned to Sydney as a general reporter and took over the court rounds for National Nine News.

In early 2007, she was appointed as news presenter on Today, filling-in for Georgie Gardner while she was on maternity leave during the first half of 2007. Later in 2007, Langdon often presented National Nine News: Morning Edition and National Nine News: Afternoon Edition  bulletins on Fridays. Langdon also presented bulletins over the 2007-08 summer. 

In 2008, Langdon was appointed as the Friday presenter of Nightline, staying in this role until the axing of the program. Langdon continued as a fill-in presenter for Nine News through 2008.

Also in 2008, Langdon released her first book; The Child Who Never Was: Looking for Tegan Lane, which examined the murder of newborn infant Tegan Lane by her mother Keli Lane.

Langdon was a senior reporter in the Sydney newsroom, and continued to fill-in on Nine News bulletins, and Today.

In February 2009, Langdon was criticised for her reporting in Marysville, Victoria, which had been devastated by the Black Saturday bushfires, and where 34 people had died. The town was sealed off as a crime scene, but Langdon and her camera crew helicoptered into the scene despite a police ban on entering the town.

In 2011, she became a reporter on the Nine Network's 60 Minutes program.

In December 2017, Langdon was appointed co-host of Weekend Today replacing Deborah Knight. She will also continue as a reporter on 60 Minutes and be a fill-in presenter on Nine News Sydney and Today.

In November 2019, the Nine Network announced that Langdon will host Today with Karl Stefanovic from January 2020.

In November 2022, Langdon was appointed as host of A Current Affair replacing Tracy Grimshaw from 2023.

Personal life
Langdon filed a stalking complaint against an admirer she alleges went too far, by sending her sexually explicit love letters. The admirer, who pleaded not guilty to the charges, and was banned from coming within 500 m of Langdon, or Channel Nine' studios in Sydney and he appeared in court on 22 June 2007.

It was reported on 26 August 2007, that Langdon had announced her engagement to journalist Michael Willesee, Jr., son of former A Current Affair host Mike Willesee. Langdon and Willesee, Jr. married in 2008. The couple had a son in January 2017, followed by a daughter in March 2019.

References

Further reading

Australian television journalists
Australian television presenters
Australian women journalists
Australian women television presenters
Living people
1979 births
Charles Sturt University alumni
60 Minutes (Australian TV program) correspondents